Samuel Lipski  (born 1938) is an Australian journalist. He has been editor-in-chief of the Australian Jewish News and has worked as a reporter and columnist for The Age, The Australian, The Bulletin and The Sydney Morning Herald. He was also Washington correspondent for the Jerusalem Post, as well as The Australian. He also worked at a senior level in television, both for Channel 9 Melbourne and with the Australian Broadcasting Corporation where he was executive producer of Four Corners and founding producer of This Day Tonight. He is chief executive of the Melbourne-based philanthropic Pratt Foundation and a former president of the State Library of Victoria. He was a commentator on Melbourne radio station 3AW.

Lipski was educated at University High School, Melbourne, the Institute for Youth Leadership, Jerusalem, and the University of Melbourne, where he graduated with the degree of Bachelor of Arts. In 1993 Lipski was honored with appointment as a Member of the Order of Australia (AM) for services to the media. Lipski was awarded a Centenary medal and in 2008 was awarded an honorary Doctor of Laws from Monash University.

He lives in Melbourne and has three children.

References

External links
http://www.samlipski.com/
http://jewishnews.net.au/tag/sam-lipski Jewish News articles by Sam Lipski

1938 births
Living people
Australian columnists
Australian television producers
Officers of the Order of Australia
Members of the Order of Australia
Journalists from Melbourne
University of Melbourne alumni
Australian Jews
Australian chief executives
People educated at University High School, Melbourne
3AW presenters

Australian newspaper editors